Raul Ferreira dos Anjos (born 31 October 1986), known as Raul, is a Brazilian footballer who plays as forward for Portuguesa.

Career statistics

References

External links
 

1986 births
Living people
Brazilian footballers
Association football forwards
Campeonato Brasileiro Série B players
Campeonato Brasileiro Série C players
Campeonato Brasileiro Série D players
São Bernardo Futebol Clube players
Esporte Clube Santo André players
Esporte Clube Juventude players
Associação Ferroviária de Esportes players
Red Bull Brasil players
Campinense Clube players
América Futebol Clube (RN) players
Associação Portuguesa de Desportos players
Clube Atlético Linense players
People from São Bernardo do Campo
Footballers from São Paulo (state)